Ryde is an electoral district of the Legislative Assembly in the Australian state of New South Wales. It includes the suburbs and localities of Denistone, Denistone East, Denistone West, Macquarie Park, Marsfield, Meadowbank, Melrose Park, Ryde, North Ryde, West Ryde; and parts of Eastwood and Epping.

It is currently represented by Victor Dominello of the Liberal Party.

History
Ryde was created originally in 1894 with the abolition of multi-member districts, from part of Central Cumberland and named after and including Ryde. It was abolished in 1904 with the downsizing of the Legislative Assembly after Federation, but recreated in 1913. In 1920, the electoral districts of Ryde, Burwood, Drummoyne, Gordon and Willoughby were combined to create a new incarnation of Ryde, which elected five members by proportional representation. This was replaced by single member electorates, including Ryde, Burwood, Drummoyne, Eastwood, Gordon and Willoughby for the 1927 election. Ryde was abolished in 1968, being partly replaced by Yaralla and Fuller. In 1981 Ryde was recreated from the part of the abolished district of Yaralla north of the Parramatta River and part of the abolished district of Fuller. In 1991, Ryde was abolished again, but in 1999, Gladesville and Eastwood were abolished and largely replaced by a fourth incarnation of Ryde and Epping.

In its current incarnation, Ryde was originally a safe Labor seat before a massive swing to the Liberals at a 2008 by-election made it a safe Liberal seat. Dominello currently holds it with a majority of 11.5 percent. On 17th August 2022, Dominello announced his plan to retire at the upcoming state election

Members for Ryde

Election results

References

External links

Electoral districts of New South Wales
1894 establishments in Australia
Constituencies established in 1894
1904 disestablishments in Australia
Constituencies disestablished in 1904
1913 establishments in Australia
Constituencies established in 1913
1968 disestablishments in Australia
Constituencies disestablished in 1968
1981 establishments in Australia
Constituencies established in 1981
1991 disestablishments in Australia
Constituencies disestablished in 1991
1999 establishments in Australia
Constituencies established in 1999